Duisburg-Obermeiderich is a railway station in Duisburg, North Rhine-Westphalia, Germany. Most of the travellers using Duisburg-Obermeiderich live in the adjacent district of Oberhausen, Alstaden.

The Station
The station is located on the Oberhausen–Duisburg-Ruhrort railway and is served by RB services operated by NordWestBahn.

Train services
The following services currently call at Duisburg-Obermeiderich:

References

Railway stations in North Rhine-Westphalia
Buildings and structures in Duisburg
Transport in Duisburg